Harriet Tubman Square station is a light rail station on the Newark Light Rail's Broad Street Extension. It is located in Downtown Newark, New Jersey, on the southbound side of Broad Street between Bridge and Lombardy Streets adjacent to the park that lends its name to the station. It is directly across from the headquarters of IDT Corporation and 1 Washington Park and during the afternoon rush hour carries many outgoing commuters from these buildings to Newark Penn Station.

Two key attractions near this station are the Newark Museum and Newark Public Library.  The station is also located near the James Street Commons Historic neighborhood, Rutgers Business School and the Polhemus house. The station is above ground, as is most of the second NLR line, except for a two-track tunnel having a portal to the south of Center Street that connects the line to the original NCS line at Newark Penn Station. This station receives only southbound trains, which leave Newark Broad Street station and continue on to NJPAC/Center Street and Newark Penn Station. Service on this line opened on July 17, 2006 at 1:00 p.m. EDT.

The station also features two installations of public art by Willie Cole, a native Newarker and African American conceptual and visual artist.

References

External links

 Station from Google Maps Street View

Newark Light Rail stations
Railway stations in the United States opened in 2006
2006 establishments in New Jersey